Chers zoiseaux is a 1976 play by French dramatist Jean Anouilh.

Plays by Jean Anouilh
1976 plays